Ange Didier Houon (26  January 1986 – 12 August 2019), known professionally as DJ Arafat, Arafat Muana and various other stage names, was an Ivorian DJ and singer who made music in the Coupé-Décalé genre. "Jonathan", "202", "Dosabado", "Kpangor", "Zoropoto" and "Enfant Beni" were some of his major hits. He was popular in French-speaking countries in Africa. He was awarded the "Best Artist of the Year" at the Coupé-Decalé Awards in the year 2016 and 2017. He died in a motorcycle accident on 12 August 2019.

Life and career

Arafat was born as Ange Didier Houon on 26 January 1986. He has an older brother well known as DJ TV3. Ange Didier started his music career in the early 2000s as a DJ when he was only 14 years old in Yopougon, a night-life district in Abidjan. He left for France to improve his career and even overstayed his visa. In 2005, he spent a month in detention as an undocumented migrant.

The stage name Arafat refers to Palestinian leader Yasser Arafat; he stated that Lebanese friends in the Ivory Coast gave him the nickname because he was “hardcore”.

He was considered one of the most popular African artists in Francophone countries around the world. He became a star of his genre around 2009.

He released 11 music albums primarily in the popular "Coupé-Décalé" dance music style, in his career that spanned fifteen years. BBC described him as the "king" of Coupé-Décalé, which means "cut and run", in Ivorian slang it means "to cheat someone and run away" and it began in the early 2000s during Ivory Coast's civil war. The music incorporates fast percussion, deep bass and hip-hop-style vocals. Arafat became the symbol of the flashy well-dressed lifestyle which is associated with the music. His song Dosabado is one of his most popular hits. He liked motorcycles and also featured them in his recent hit 'Moto Moto' released in May 2019. He had multiple motorcycle accidents, one of which in 2009, was serious. Arafat's motorcycle accident in 2019 was fatal.

Arafat later became popular in the Europe and the United States when some of the sports personalities popularized the dance steps of coupé-décalé genre. "Dosabado", "Kpangor", "Zoropoto", "Enfant Beni" and "Moto, Moto" were some of his major hits.

Death
On 12 August 2019, Arafat died in Abidjan Hospital after a motorcycle accident in Abidjan, Ivory Coast. His motorcycle was said to have collided with a car in the Angre neighborhood on Sunday, 11 August 2019. He was subsequently admitted to a hospital in Abidjan for a skull fracture before eventually dying at around 8:00a.m. UTC on 12 August 2019.

After the news of his death spread, on 12 August 2019, around 1,000 of his fans assembled in Cocody suburb near the hospital where he died, and mourned his death chanting "Arafat cannot die". After his burial, some fans exhumed his grave after a rumor sufficed that his body was given to cult members. Police struggled to manage the crowd gathered in the area. A crowd of his fans also gathered around his house singing some of his hits. Maurice Kouakou Bandaman, the Ivorian Culture Minister, condoled his death and a tribute was held in his honour.

Awards
He was awarded the "Best Artist of the Year" at the Coupé-Decalé Awards in 2016 and 2017. He also won two WatsUp TV Africa Music Video Awards in 2016.

WatsUp TV Africa Music Video Awards

|-
|rowspan=2|2016
|Maplôrly
|Best West African Video 
|
|-
|Concert a Korhogo
|Best African Performance
|
|-
|}

Selected discography

Singles (partial)
 Kpangor
 Zropoto
 Boudha
 Djessimidjeka
 Agbangnan
 2017 : "Enfant béni"
 2018 : "Dosabado"
 2019 : "Moto Moto"
 2019 : "Kong"

Tours

References

External links
 

21st-century Ivorian male singers
1986 births
2019 deaths
People from Abidjan
Road incident deaths in Ivory Coast
Motorcycle road incident deaths